The Great Waltz may refer to:

The Great Waltz (musical), 1934 American Broadway musical about the Strauss family
The Great Waltz (1938 film), American musical biography of Johann Strauss II
The Great Waltz (1972 film), American musical biography of Johann Strauss II